Court Farmhouse and the attached Court Farm Cottage, Llanover, Monmouthshire is a country house dating from the early 16th century. Originally two houses, which became the East and West wings of a larger house, with a connecting hall constructed in the 17th century, it is now again sub-divided. The house is a Grade II* listed building.

History
The architectural historian John Newman records that the origins of the house are "two small early houses" of the 16th century which were joined by a hall-range in the 17th century. Kelly's Directory of 1901 records the farm as being in the possession of a David Robert. The farm remains a private building and is the estate office for the Llanover and Coldbrook Estate, as well as providing space for small businesses.

Architecture and description
The house is of two storeys and is constructed of stone, with stone tiling roofs. John Newman notes the "splendid 17th century hall" with contemporary panelling. The Farm, and the attached cottage are a Grade II* listed building, its listing describing it as a "fine house with early 16th century origins and well-preserved 16th and 17th century detailing".

Notes

References 
 

Grade II* listed buildings in Monmouthshire
Country houses in Wales
Grade II* listed houses